Gråhøe (or its alternate spellings Gråhø, Gråhøi or Gråhøa) may refer to:

Gråhøe (Dovre), a mountain in Dovre municipality in Innlandet county, Norway
Gråhø (Lesja), a mountain in Lesja municipality in Innlandet county, Norway
Gråhøe (Lom), a mountain in Lom municipality in Innlandet county, Norway
Gråhø (Nord-Fron), a mountain in Nord-Fron municipality in Innlandet county, Norway
Gråhøe (Sel), a mountain in Sel municipality in Innlandet county, Norway
Gråhøi (Øystre Slidre), a mountain in Øystre Slidre municipality in Innlandet county, Norway